The Voice Weekly was a news journal published in Burmese language. The journal was launched in 2004, and the first issue appeared in September 2004. The founding publisher was Myanmar Partners Think Tank Group. It was more focused on Burmese political issues. It was suspended one week together with 7 Days News for publishing Aung San Suu Kyi news on front page in November 2011. The magazine was suspended by the government in July 2012.

Following the seizure of power by the military government in February 2021, it was officially announced that the Voice Weekly journal would cease publication in March of the same year.

References

External links
 Official website
 Mirror site

Magazines established in 2004
Magazines disestablished in 2012
Mass media in Yangon
Voice Weekly
Weekly magazines